Kateryna Borysivna Palekha (born 20 September 1980) is an athlete from Ukraine.  She competes in archery.

Palekha represented Ukraine at the 2004 Summer Olympics and 2012 Summer Olympics.

At the 2004 Summer Olympics, She placed 59th in the women's individual ranking round with a 72-arrow score of 595.  In the first round of elimination, she faced 6th-ranked Yuan Shu Chi of Chinese Taipei.  Palekha lost 162-158 in the 18-arrow match, placing 33rd overall in women's individual archery.

Palekha was also a member of the 6th-place Ukrainian team in the women's team archery competition.

At the 2012 Summer Olympics, she lost to Miranda Leek in the last 64.  The Ukrainian team that she was part of also lost in the first round, to the Japanese team.

References

1980 births
Living people
Sportspeople from Lviv
Ukrainian female archers
Olympic archers of Ukraine
Archers at the 2004 Summer Olympics
Archers at the 2012 Summer Olympics
Universiade medalists in archery
Universiade silver medalists for Ukraine
Medalists at the 2003 Summer Universiade
Medalists at the 2005 Summer Universiade
21st-century Ukrainian women